Enver Ziya Karal (1906–1982) was a former academic in Turkey.

Early life

He was born in Kosovo , then a part of the Ottoman Empire. During the Balkan Wars (1912–1913) in which his father and other relatives were killed, he came to Istanbul to study in the Ortaköy Orphans' School. Later he continued in the Edirne high school. He graduated in 1928 and he travelled to France by the government scholarship. In France he studied history in the University of Lyon

University years
In 1933 he returned to Istanbul and was appointed as a history associate professor in the School of letters of Istanbul University. In 1942 he came to Ankara as a professor to serve in the School of Language and History - Geography. Between 30 April 1948 and 22 June 1949 he was elected as the  rector of Ankara University.In 1960 he gained the title distinguished professor. He also lectured in the University of Columbia in the United States and the University of Manchester in the United Kingdom as a visiting professor.

Other posts and duties
In 1953, he was tasked with the restoration of Atatürk's house in Thessaloniki, Greece . In the Constituent Assembly of Turkey in 1960–1961 term, he was elected as the speaker of the committee which was responsible for the new constitution. In 1971 he served in European Commission in behalf of Turkey. Between he 1972–1982 he was the president of Turkish Historical Society. He died on 18 January 1982 in Ankara

References

1906 births
1982 deaths
People from Kosovo vilayet
University of Lyon alumni
Academic staff of Ankara University
Academic staff of Istanbul University
Rectors of Ankara University
20th-century Turkish historians